

Station List

Na

Ne

Ni

No

Nu

N